Sheikh Ahmad Zainuddin Makhdoom bin Sheikh Muhammad Al Gazzali (Arabic: شيخ احمد زين الدين بن شيخ محمد غزالي المليباري; Ahmad Zayn al-Din ibn Muhammad al-Ghazāli al-Malibári), grandson of Sheikh Zainuddin Makhdoom I, was the writer, orator, historian, jurisprudent and spiritual leader and widely known as Zainuddin Makhdoom Second or Zaniudeen Makhdoom Al Sageer (زين الدين المخدوم الصغير) whose family originated from Yemen. He inherited the legacy of his grandfather and was installed as the Chief Qadi (judge) in the locality of Ponnani, Kerala, India, as well as appointed as the Chief Müderris (head teacher) in the historic Ponnani Dars at Ponnani Jum'ah Masjid, that buit by Zainuddin Makhdoom I.

Early life
He was born to the Makdoom family in the early months of Hijra 938 (c. 1531 CE) at Chombal, near Mahe, and received religious instruction under the supervision of his grandfather. He completed his primary education under his father Muhammed Gazzali and his uncle Abdul Azeez Bin Sheikh Makhdoom Al Avval ( عبد العزيز بن شيخ مخدوم الآول) and left for Makah for further study. He performed the Haj and settled there for ten years imbibing Islamic knowledge from exponents of Islamic law and other branches of knowledge. He received the guidance of famous scholars such as Al Hafiz Shihabuddeen bin Al Hajr Al Haithemi (الحافظ شهاب الدين بن الحجر الهيتمي), Grand Mufti of Haramain (chief jurisprudent of Makah and Madina) and commentator in Hadeeth and Fiqh, Izzuddeen bin Abdul Azeez al Zamzami (عز الدين بن عبد العزيز الزمزمي), Shiekh Abdul Rahman bin Ziyad (شيخ عبد الرحمن بن زياد) and Sayyid Abdul Rahman Al Safwi (سيد عبد الرحمن الصفوي).
He gained the Tassawwuf (Sufi spiritual knowledge) from Kutub Zaban Zain Ul Arifeen Muhammed Bin Sheikh Ul Arif Abu Hasan Al Bakri (قطب الزمان زين العارفين محمد بن شيخ العارف ابو حسن البكري) and was honored with eleven Khirkath (خرقة), symbol of grade in Tareeqath. Within a short period he was hailed as the Sheikh of Qadriya Tareeqath.

In the field of service
After the decade-long stay in Makkah, he returned to Kerala and took charge as chief Mufti in the grand Masjid of Ponnani, a position he occupied for thirty-six years. A historian recorded that his mentor Ibn Hajar Hithami had come to Ponnani and stayed there for a short period. It is said that the famous lamp made of stone, presented by Ibn Hajar Hithami, is still kept in Ponnani Dars.

As the freedom fighter
He did not limit himself to work as a cleric, but made many significant intervention in the political arena, keeping warm relations with the major political figures in that period. He lived during the regime of Akbar of the Mughal Empire and had a good relationship with Sultan Ali Adil Shah I, Sultan of Bijapur, as well as the Zamorin of Calicut. He was a strident advocate of freedom struggles against the imperialist power of Portugal, and motivated the youth to take part in the special army of Zamorin to defend against them. In his masterpiece Tufathul Mujahideen Fi Akhbar ul Burthugalin, he narrated the brutality of the Portuguese on the Malabar soil with special reference to their anti-Muslim stance. He used to instil in Muslim youth the necessity of holy war and the inevitability of military action against the Portuguese. In the aforementioned text, he motivated them by exuding the endless promises of the Almighty for those who waged war against them, and boosted their morale by leading their mind to the sweet memories of the golden age of Islam.

Books by Makhdoom II
He was known for his unique command in writing in variety of subjects which includes jurisprudence, history, spirituality as well as other subjects which were distinct from other writers. The following table gives an overview of his works.

Demise 
He died of natural causes in 1583 and was laid to rest in Mahe Kunjhippalli. His khabar lies under a tree in his native Champal.

References

Further reading 

1530s births
1583 deaths
Sunni fiqh scholars
Shafi'i fiqh scholars
Indian independence movement
Writers from Kerala